Infinite Stratos is an anime series adapted from the light novels of the same title written by author Izuru Yumizuru and illustrator Okiura published by Media Factory. The anime is produced by Eight Bit, directed by Yasuhito Kikuchi, series composition by Fumihiko Shimo, character design by Tomoyasu Kurashima, art directed by Shunichiro Yoshihara and sound directed by Masafumi Mima and Toshihiko Nakajima. Set in the near future, a powered exoskeleton called "Infinite Stratos" (IS), which possesses advanced technology and combat capabilities, changes the world including a major effect on society, as only women can pilot IS. The story focuses on Ichika Orimura, discovered to be the first ever male IS pilot. He is enrolled to the prestigious Infinite Stratos Academy, an international academy where IS pilots from all over the world are trained. There he meets Houki Shinonono, who is his childhood friend and younger sister of the creator of the IS. Along with other IS students from different nations, Ichika and Houki's busy school life begins. The anime follows the first three volumes of the light novels.

The first season aired in Japan from January 7 to April 1, 2011 on TBS, with subsequent runs on Chubu-Nippon Broadcasting, Sun Television, Kyoto Broadcasting System and BS-i. The series is licensed in North America by Sentai Filmworks, with Anime Network simulcasting the series on their video website. Six DVD and Blu-ray volumes will be released by Media Factory between March 30 and September 21, 2011. An original video animation, entitled , was released in Japan on DVD and Blu-ray on December 7, 2011.

The opening theme for the first season is "Straight Jet", performed by Minami Kuribayashi. The ending theme song is "Super∞Stream", with the first episode version sung by Yōko Hikasa, the second and third episode version sung by Hikasa and Yukana, the fourth and fifth episode version sung by Hikasa, Yukana and Asami Shimoda, the sixth and seventh episode version sung by Hikasa, Yukana, Shimoda and Kana Hanazawa and the final version for the rest of episodes sung by Hikasa, Yukana, Shimoda, Hanazawa and Marina Inoue. Each version of the song reflects the voice actresses' character who is running with Ichika in the episode's ending credits.

The second season aired in Japan from October 4 to December 20, 2013 on TBS, with subsequent runs on Chubu-Nippon Broadcasting, Sun Television, Kyoto Broadcasting System and BS-i. The opening theme, "True Blue Traveler", is once again performed by Minami Kuribayashi

Episode list

Infinite Stratos (2011)

Infinite Stratos 2 (2013)

Notes

References
General

External links
Official Anime website 
Official Anime Twitter page 

Infinite Stratos